Starting from 2020, the median per capita income is calculated in Russia, based on the size of which the subsistence minimum and minimum wage are also calculated. The median salary is an indicator that the same number of people receive more or less in the country. This indicator more accurately reflects the situation than the average monthly salary according to Rosstat (Russian Federal State Statistics Service). So, according to Sberindex in 2020, the median salary for all industries in Russia amounted to 31540 rubles in January and 38278 rubles in December. In January 2021, it amounted to 33549 rubles, in December 2021 - 42,801 rubles. In January 2022, the median salary was 37429 rubles, in December 2022 - 49627 rubles.

Also the following article is about the average salaries by Russian federal subjects. The article shows the latest data published by Rosstat of June 2022.

List of federal subjects by average gross wage 

There is large economic inequality between regions in Russia. Regions in the Asian part of Russia are on average much richer than regions in the European part (excluding Moscow and Saint Petersburg).

Data as of the end of 2022. US Dollar exchange rate on March 1, 2023.
Note: The rankings are arranged randomly.

The meaning of the "average salary" in Russia is extremely formal and symbolic. For example, in the Chechen Republic, where the average salary is the lowest (31,291), in most cases people receive 12,000-16,000 rubles. Similar situation is also in other regions.

References

External links 

 Rosstat: Average wages by region

Wage